Palmiro Salas is a Guatemalan football coach best known for managing the Belize national football team during 2010 World Cup Qualification. Besides Guatemala, he has managed in Belize.

As of 2018, Salas currently manages the San Pedro Pirates of the Premier League of Belize.

Belize

Sacked as head coach of the Belize national team in 2008 which was seen as an unjust decision by the Football Federation of Belize to some, after he led them to a 3–1 win over St Kitts and Nevis, Salas became involved in a conflict with the FFB, making an incendiary statement that they were supposed to pay him 26000 Belize dollars when they only give him 5000.

The Guatemalan returned to Belizean football in 2009 when announced as coach of Belize Defence Force.

In June 2018, he was reappointed as coach for the Belize national team.

Personal life

He was assaulted by two thieves on the 21st of August 2008.

References

Living people
Expatriate football managers in Belize
Guatemalan expatriate sportspeople in Belize
Guatemalan football managers
Guatemalan expatriate football managers
Belize national football team managers
1964 births